Maeonius (died 267), or Maconius, was a fictional usurper who, according to the Historia Augusta, briefly ruled over Palmyra. He is included in the list of the Thirty Tyrants.

Life
He was the nephew (according to Zonaras xii.24) or the cousin (according to Historia Augusta) of Odaenathus of Palmyra, who had taken control of the eastern provinces of the Roman Empire after the defeat in battle and capture of Emperor Valerian by Shapur I of the Sasanian Empire.

According to Historia Augusta, Maeonius killed Odaenathus and his son Hairan during a celebration, because of a conspiracy organised by Zenobia, wife of Odaenathus, who wanted her sons to succeed her husband instead of Hairan (who was the son of Odaenathus by another woman). According to Gibbon, the murder was revenge for a short confinement imposed on Maeonius by Odaenathus for being disrespectful.

Zonaras tells that Maeonius was killed immediately after the murder of Odaenathus, while Historia has Maeonius proclaiming himself emperor, with Zenobia having him soon killed, in order to take the power for herself.

References 
 
 Gibbon, Edward, The Decline And Fall Of The Roman Empire, "Chapter XI: Reign Of Claudius, Defeat Of The Goths. -- Part III."
 The Lives of the Thirty Pretenders, at LacusCurtius

260s deaths
3rd-century Arabs
Thirty Tyrants (Roman)
Rulers of Palmyra
Year of birth unknown
Palmyrene Empire